Paul Stanford Thompson (born May 25, 1961) was an American former professional basketball player who played in the National Basketball Association (NBA). He was drafted in the third round of the 1983 NBA draft by the Cleveland Cavaliers. In 1985, Thompson was traded to the Milwaukee Bucks for two draft picks. Later in the year, he signed with the Philadelphia 76ers after being waived by the Bucks.

Career statistics

NBA

Regular season

|-
| align="left" | 1983–84
| align="left" | Cleveland
| style="background:#cfecec;" | 82* || 10 || 21.1 || .467 || .231 || .772 || 3.8 || 1.5 || 0.9 || 0.5 || 9.0
|-
| align="left" | 1984–85
| align="left" | Cleveland
| 33 || 27 || 21.7 || .418 || .261 || .849 || 3.5 || 1.8 || 1.2 || 0.6 || 10.5
|-
| align="left" | 1984–85
| align="left" | Milwaukee
| 16 || 0 || 14.2 || .390 || .000 || .706 || 2.6 || 1.3 || 0.9 || 0.3 || 6.6
|-
| align="left" | 1985–86
| align="left" | Philadelphia
| 23 || 8 || 18.8 || .361 || .167 || .860 || 2.7 || 1.0 || 0.7 || 0.7 || 7.8
|- class="sortbottom"
| style="text-align:center;" colspan="2"| Career
| 154 || 45 || 20.2 || .432 || .210 || .792 || 3.5 || 1.5 || 0.9 || 0.5 || 8.9
|}

Playoffs

|-
| align="left" | 1984–85
| align="left" | Milwaukee
| 3 || 0 || 11.3 || .417 || .000 || .600 || 1.7 || 0.7 || 1.3 || 0.3 || 4.3
|}

College

|-
| align="left" | 1979–80
| align="left" | Tulane
| 26 || - || 31.2 || .462 || - || .700 || 8.2 || 1.3 || 1.6 || 0.9 || 15.0
|-
| align="left" | 1980–81
| align="left" | Tulane
| 27 || 26 || 35.7 || .447 || - || .805 || 9.4 || 1.9 || 1.2 || 1.3 || 18.7
|-
| align="left" | 1981–82
| align="left" | Tulane
| 28 || 27 || 34.0 || .493 || - || .782 || 7.4 || 1.8 || 0.9 || 0.5 || 14.7
|-
| align="left" | 1982–83
| align="left" | Tulane
| 31 || 29 || 36.4 || .508 || - || .795 || 7.4 || 1.9 || 1.3 || 0.7 || 17.5
|- class="sortbottom"
| style="text-align:center;" colspan="2"| Career
| 112 || 82 || 34.4 || .477 || - || .776 || 8.1 || 1.7 || 1.2 || 0.8 || 16.5
|}

References

1961 births
Living people
African-American basketball players
American expatriate basketball people in France
American expatriate basketball people in Israel
American expatriate basketball people in Italy
American expatriate basketball people in Spain
American expatriate basketball people in the Netherlands
American men's basketball players
Basketball players from Tennessee
Bnei HaSharon players
Cleveland Cavaliers draft picks
Cleveland Cavaliers players
Heroes Den Bosch players
Dinamo Sassari players
FC Barcelona Bàsquet players
Ironi Ramat Gan players
La Crosse Catbirds players
Liga ACB players
Limoges CSP players
Maccabi Ra'anana players
Milwaukee Bucks players
People from Smyrna, Tennessee
Philadelphia 76ers players
Shooting guards
Small forwards
Tulane Green Wave men's basketball players
21st-century African-American people
20th-century African-American sportspeople